Brock Kenneth Jones (born March 28, 2001) is an American professional baseball outfielder in the Tampa Bay Rays organization.

Amateur career
Jones attended Buchanan High School in Clovis, California, where he played baseball and football. As a junior in 2018, he batted .346 with two home runs, 15 RBIs, and 34 runs scored. Unselected out of high school in the 2019 Major League Baseball draft, he enrolled at Stanford University to play both baseball and football.

Jones made 11 appearances for the Cardinal football team as a freshman before choosing to focus solely on baseball. As a freshman for the baseball team, he started 16 games in which he batted .228 with one home run before the season was cancelled due to the COVID-19 pandemic. In 2021, as a redshirt freshman, Jones started 56 games in which he slashed .311/.453/.646 with 18 home runs, 62 RBIs, 14 stolen bases, and 13 doubles. That summer, he was selected to play for the USA Baseball Collegiate National Team. Jones entered the 2022 season as a top prospect for the upcoming draft. Over 65 games, he compiled a slash line of .324/.451/.664 with 21 home runs and 57 RBIs and was awarded an ABCA/Rawlings Gold Glove.

Professional career
The Tampa Bay Rays selected Jones in the second round with the 65th overall pick in the 2022 Major League Baseball draft. He signed with the team for $1.1 million. 

Jones made his professional debut with the Florida Complex League Rays and was later promoted to the Charleston RiverDogs. Over 19 games between both teams, he hit .265 with four home runs, 14 RBIs, and 11 stolen bases.

References

External links
Stanford Cardinal bio

Living people
2001 births
Baseball players from California
Baseball outfielders
Stanford Cardinal baseball players
United States national baseball team players
Florida Complex League Rays players
Charleston RiverDogs players